Professional sports leagues in the United States include several major leagues as well as other professional and semi-professional leagues.

Major leagues

The major sports leagues tend to have the greatest fan interest, have national TV contracts, draw high fan attendance, and have teams located throughout the largest metropolitan areas in the United States.

Major League Baseball
Major League Baseball is the highest level of play of baseball in North America. It consists of the National League (founded in 1876) and the American League (founded in 1901). Cooperation between the two leagues began in 1903, and the two merged on an organizational level in 2000 with the elimination of separate league offices; they have shared a single Commissioner since 1920. There are currently 30 member teams, with 29 located in the U.S. and 1 in Canada. Traditionally called the "National Pastime", baseball was the first professional sport in the U.S.

National Basketball Association
The National Basketball Association is the premier basketball league in the world. It was founded as the Basketball Association of America in 1946, and adopted its current name in 1949, when the BAA partially absorbed the rival National Basketball League. Four teams from the rival American Basketball Association joined the NBA with the ABA–NBA merger in 1976. It currently has 30 teams, 29 in the United States and 1 in Canada. The NBA is watched by audiences both domestically and internationally.

National Football League
The National Football League was founded in 1920 as a combination of various teams from regional leagues such as the Ohio League, the New York Pro Football League, and the Chicago circuit. The NFL partially absorbed the All-America Football Conference in 1949 and merged with the American Football League in 1970. It has 32 teams, all located in the United States.

NFL games are the most attended of domestic professional leagues in the world in terms of per-game attendance, and the most popular in the U.S. in terms of television ratings and merchandising. Its championship game, the Super Bowl, is the most watched annual event on U.S. television, with Super Bowl XLIX being the single most-watched program in U.S. television history.

The NFL is the only one of the major American leagues not to have a presence in Canada, where the Canadian Football League is the premier professional league in the separate though related sport of Canadian football.

National Hockey League
The National Hockey League is the only one of the major leagues to have been founded in Canada. It was formed in 1917 as a successor to Canada's NHA, the National Hockey Association (founded 1909), taking all but one of the NHA's teams. The NHL partially absorbed the rival World Hockey Association (WHA) in 1979. As of the 2021–22 season there are 32 teams in the NHL, with 25 in the U.S. and 7 in Canada, with the Seattle Kraken joining for the 2021–22 season.

The most popular sports league in Canada, and widely followed across the northern U.S., the NHL has expanded southward in recent decades to attempt to gain a more national following in the United States, in cities such as Dallas, Miami, Nashville, Phoenix, Las Vegas, Raleigh, and Tampa, with varying success. Hockey remains much more popular in the northern states of the U.S. closer to Canada, such as the Upper Midwest (8 NHL teams), New England and the New York to Washington area (5 NHL teams), than in the rest of the United States. The NHL has more Canadian teams (seven) than Major League Baseball (MLB), the National Basketball Association (NBA), the National Football League (NFL), and Major League Soccer (MLS) combined (five).

Major League Soccer
Major League Soccer (MLS) is the top-level men's professional soccer league in the United States and Canada. As of the next MLS season in 2023, the league has 29 teams — 26 in the United States and 3 in Canada. The league is expanding to 29 teams in 2023. MLS began play in 1996, its creation a requirement by FIFA for awarding the United States the right to host the 1994 World Cup. MLS is the first major Division I outdoor soccer league in the U.S. or Canada since the North American Soccer League (NASL) operated from 1968 to 1984.

MLS has increased in popularity following the adoption of the Designated Player rule in 2007, which allowed MLS to sign stars such as David Beckham and Thierry Henry. In 2014, MLS reported an average attendance of 19,148 per game, with total attendance exceeding 6.1 million overall, both breaking previous MLS attendance records. With an average attendance of over 20,000 per game, MLS has the third highest average attendance of any sports league in the U.S. after the National Football League (NFL) and Major League Baseball (MLB), and is the seventh highest attended professional soccer league worldwide.

Nate Silver of the ESPN-owned website FiveThirtyEight has argued that there is a case to be made for the inclusion of MLS in the major professional sports leagues of North America.

"The 5 Major Sports Leagues"

Other top-level professional leagues
In addition to the major sports leagues, there are several other top-level professional sports leagues in the United States. These leagues usually lack TV contracts for popular network TV or mainstream cable channels, draw more modest attendance, and generally pay significantly lower salaries than the major sports leagues. An example is World Team Tennis founded in the mid 1970s.

Major League Cricket
Major League Cricket (MLC) is an upcoming professional Twenty20 cricket league in the United States. Operated by American Cricket Enterprises (ACE) and sanctioned by USA Cricket, it plans to begin play in 2023, with six teams in major U.S. cities under a single-entity model. In 2021, the development league for MLC, Minor League Cricket (MiLC), completed its inaugural season, which was contested by 27 franchise-based teams

Lacrosse: NLL and PLL
The National Lacrosse League (NLL) is a men's professional box lacrosse league in North America. It currently has 15 teams: 10 in the United States and 5 in Canada. The NLL plays its games in the winter and spring. The league's American teams have historically been concentrated in the northeastern United States, and two of the league's longest-established and most commercially successful teams, the Buffalo Bandits and Rochester Knighthawks, still reside there. Each year, the playoff teams battle for the National Lacrosse League Cup. The NLL has averaged between 9,400 and 10,700 spectators per game each year since 2004.

The Premier Lacrosse League is a professional field lacrosse league. Its competitive model radically differs from those of other U.S. professional leagues—its eight teams play a tour-based schedule, traveling between various markets where the sport enjoys significant popularity. Each week, the league visits a different market, with all teams playing. It absorbed the older Major League Lacrosse in a merger in 2020.

Women's National Basketball Association
The Women's National Basketball Association (WNBA) is the top competition in women's basketball. Currently the WNBA is one of two fully professional women's sports leagues operating in North America. Founded in 1996 and beginning play in the 1997 season, it is the longest-running American professional women's sport league in history.
 
The league's attendance started with about 10,000 per game in the 1990s, steadied in the 7,000 to 8,000 range in most of the 2010s, before dropping under 7,000 since 2018. As WNBA attendance has fallen, both the Atlanta Dream and Washington Mystics have moved from arenas seating over 18,000 to ones with less than 5,000; the New York Liberty made a similar move, but had planned to return to an NBA arena in 2020 after being purchased by an NBA team owner (said return was delayed to 2021 due to COVID-19). Total attendance was 1,598,160 in 2010. In 2007, the league signed a television deal with ESPN that ran from 2009 to 2016. This deal is the first to ever pay rights fees to women's teams. In 2009, it had a total television viewership of 413,000 in combined cable and broadcast television.

National Women's Soccer League
The National Women's Soccer League (NWSL) is a professional women's soccer league run by the United States Soccer Federation. At the top of the United States league system, it is the country's primary competition for women's soccer. The NWSL was established in 2012 as a successor to Women's Professional Soccer (2007–2012). The league began play in 2013 with eight teams; four of which were former members of Women's Professional Soccer. With the addition of two expansion teams in Houston and Orlando since the league's founding, it reached a peak of 10 teams based throughout the United States. Following the 2017 season, the league dropped to 9 teams following the demise of two charter members, one of which was replaced by a new franchise. The league returned to 10 teams for 2021. Utah Royals FC, which had inherited the roster of the defunct FC Kansas City after the 2017 season, itself folded after the 2020 season, with its roster being taken over by a new Kansas City ownership group that now fields the Kansas City Current. The completely new Racing Louisville FC also started play in 2021. The NWSL added two teams in 2022, the Los Angeles-based Angel City FC and San Diego Wave FC.

Major League Rugby
Major League Rugby is the highest level of professional rugby union in the United States and Canada. The competition is supported and sanctioned by USA Rugby. The first season of Major League Rugby began in May 2018 with seven teams ranging from the Pacific Northwest to the Southwest. The top four teams make the playoffs for a spot in the final, the winner receives the American Championship Shield. Thirteen teams competed in the 2022 season but will be reduced to twelve in the 2023 season, with Chicago replacing Los Angeles and Austin.

Premier Hockey Federation
In 2015, the Premier Hockey Federation launched under the name of National Women's Hockey League (NWHL) as the first professional women's hockey league in North America. Previous women's hockey leagues, such as the high-level Canadian Women's Hockey League (CWHL), were non-paid and teams operated with primarily local players. Many teams, such as the Minnesota Whitecaps, operated independently to give women a place to keep playing after their college careers. The NWHL had four teams in its inaugural season that competed for the Isobel Cup. It has since also added the Whitecaps for the 2018–19 season, the Toronto Six for 2020–21, and the Montreal Force for 2022–23, and adopted the Premier Hockey Federation name starting in 2021–22.

The CWHL was primarily based out of Canada from 2007 to 2019, but also had a team in the United States and up to two teams in China. The CWHL teams competed for the Clarkson Cup, a trophy that was previously awarded to the best women's hockey team regardless of league before it became the de facto CHWL championship in 2011. The CWHL began paying its players a stipend in 2017 to compete with the NWHL, based largely off its expansion into China. The CWHL ceased operations in 2019 citing that the two leagues could not coexist, splitting the potential sponsorship revenue, and still be financially feasible.

Following the demise of the CWHL, players from both leagues were dissatisfied in the operation of both the NWHL and CWHL in that neither league provided health insurance or a livable salary. Due to these conditions, over 200 players released a joint statement announcing their intent to not participate in any North American professional league for the 2019–20 season. The players formed a worker's union called the Professional Women's Hockey Player Association (PWHPA) to further push for their stated goals of a league that provides financial and infrastructure resources to players, health insurance, and support to training programs for young female players. Members of the PWHPA hold tournaments in various locations in support of their cause for a creating a fully professional women's league.

Esports 
Major League Gaming
NBA 2K League
ESL Pro League
League Championship Series

Minor leagues

Several of the major sports leagues in the United States have other professional leagues in tiers below them. For example, Major League Baseball has an extensive "farm system" of minor league teams. Similarly, below Major League Soccer (as of 2022) are the Division II USL Championship and three Division III leagues—USL League One, the National Independent Soccer Association, and MLS Next Pro.

Minor League Baseball

Minor League Baseball is a hierarchy of professional baseball leagues in the United States and Canada that compete at levels below Major League Baseball (MLB) and provide opportunities for player development and a way to prepare for the major leagues. All of the minor leagues are operated as independent businesses. Most are members of the umbrella organization known as Minor League Baseball (MiLB), which operates under the Commissioner of Baseball within the scope of organized baseball, a five-tier league hierarchy (six when Major League Baseball is included as the top tier) that classifies leagues by level of development. The highest level of minor league baseball, Triple-A, features high level major league prospects almost ready to join the majors playing in large cities without MLB franchises, while each successively lower class (Double-A, High-A, Low-A, and Rookie) features players with correspondingly less experience and, generally, playing in smaller markets. Additionally, several independent baseball leagues, none of which had any official links to Major League Baseball before 2021 (with only four now having such links), also operate, with varying quality of competition, some in suburban communities too close to affiliated baseball teams to avoid territorial exclusivity.

Soccer: USL
The USL Championship is a professional men's soccer league in the United States and Canada that began its inaugural season in 2011. The USL Championship is sanctioned as a Division II Professional League by the United States Soccer Federation (U.S. Soccer). The league is owned and operated by United Soccer League (USL; formerly United Soccer Leagues) and was formed as result of the organization's merger of the old USL First and Second Divisions. The merger is meant to consolidate USL's position within the American professional soccer landscape and focus on stability, commercial growth and the professional development of soccer in four main regions throughout the United States and Canada. In January 2013, USL and MLS reached an agreement to integrate USL Pro league competition with the MLS Reserve League, primarily to improve player development in North America, strengthen league competition and build ties between divisions in the American soccer pyramid. This multi-year deal encourages MLS and USL Pro team affiliations and player loans, and it will lead to more games for teams and developing players.

The USL Championship (USLC), rebranded from "United Soccer League" after the 2018 season, fields 27 teams in its ongoing 2022 season. The league peaked at 36 teams in 2019, but since that season, three teams folded entirely, with one doing so because of the 2023 arrival of a new MLS team in its city; two others were withdrawn from the USL system by their MLS parent clubs (those sides would eventually be revived in MLS Next Pro); three other MLS reserve sides moved directly from the USLC to Next Pro; another was replaced in 2020 by a new MLS team in the same city; and two voluntarily dropped to the third-level USL League One. One of the teams that folded in 2019 sold its USLC franchise rights to a preexisting club in Miami, which thus joined the USLC. Two California-based teams joined in the 2020s, with San Diego doing so in 2020 and Oakland in 2021. More teams are set to start play in the coming years, but several MLS affiliates will leave after the 2022 season for MLS Next Pro.

Major League Soccer pulled most of its lower-level affiliates from the USL system in the early 2020s in preparation for MLS Next Pro, a new third-level league that launched in 2022. Of the 21 teams playing in the inaugural season, 20 are MLS reserve sides. In the 2023 season, all US-based MLS teams except D.C. United will field their reserve sides in Next Pro.

The USL corporation launched a new third-division league, known as USL League One (USL1), for the 2019 season. That league began play with 10 teams and expanded to 11 in 2020, a number it has maintained in both subsequent seasons, although the lineup of USL1 teams has changed after each of its seasons to date. The league is currently set to expand to 14 teams in 2023.

A new third division league, the National Independent Soccer Association (NISA), was founded in 2019 and is semi-professional.

Minor hockey leagues
The American Hockey League (AHL) is a 31-team professional ice hockey league based in the United States and Canada that serves as the primary developmental league for the National Hockey League (NHL). Since the 2010–11 season, every team in the league has an affiliation agreement with an NHL team. Twenty-seven AHL teams are located in the United States and the remaining four are in Canada. The annual playoff champion is awarded the Calder Cup, named for Frank Calder, the first president (1917–1943) of the NHL. The league's players are represented by the Professional Hockey Players' Association (PHPA).

The ECHL is a mid-level professional ice hockey league with teams across the United States and two franchises in Canada. It is a tier below the AHL. Like the AHL, the league's players are represented by the PHPA. All but four NHL teams have affiliations with an ECHL team with Los Angeles, San Jose, Seattle, and Winnipeg having no official affiliations as of 2022. However, these teams do sometimes lend contracted players to ECHL teams for development and increased playing time. The league's regular season begins in October and ends in April.

The AHL and the ECHL are the only minor leagues recognized by the collective bargaining agreement between the NHL and the National Hockey League Players' Association, meaning any player signed to an entry-level NHL contract and designated for assignment must report to a club in either the ECHL or the AHL.

Additionally, lower-level professional leagues include the Southern Professional Hockey League (SPHL), Federal Prospects Hockey League (FPHL), and Ligue Nord-Américaine de Hockey (LNAH). These leagues operate largely independently, though some SPHL teams are used as affiliates by ECHL teams.

Basketball
The NBA G League, formerly the NBA Development League (D-League), is the National Basketball Association's official minor league basketball organization. The D-League started with eight teams in the fall of 2001. In March 2005, NBA commissioner David Stern announced a plan to expand the D-League to 15 teams and develop it into a true minor league farm system, with each D-League team affiliated with one or more NBA teams. At the conclusion of the 2013–14 NBA season, 33% of NBA players had spent time in the D-League, up from 23% in 2011. The last completed season of 2018–19 featured 27 teams; the 2019–20 season, which was started but not completed due to COVID-19, featured 28. With COVID-19 still impacting the league in 2020–21, 11 of the intended 29 teams chose to sit out that season. The league initially planned to add a Mexican team in 2020–21, but that team's G League debut was delayed to 2021–22. All G League teams are either owned by an NBA franchise or affiliated with a single NBA team; the last "independent" team, the Fort Wayne Mad Ants, was acquired by the Indiana Pacers in September 2015. The G League also features a developmental team, NBA G League Ignite, that plays exhibitions against G League franchises during the season; the NBA created this team as an alternative to college basketball for elite high school prospects.

American football
In contrast with the other major sports, the National Football League does not maintain an official minor league system. The only league to have served as a minor league to the entire NFL was NFL Europe; teams in NFL Europe were not affiliated with an individual NFL squad, but instead received prospects from all of the NFL's teams, who played in Europe during the offseason, then returned stateside in time for training camp. Individual NFL teams over the course of their history signed affiliation deals with the American Association in the 1930s, the Association of Professional Football Leagues in the 1940s, and the Atlantic Coast Football League in the 1960s. In addition to these leagues, NFL owners also operated franchises in the Arena Football League in the 2000s (decade); this arrangement differed in that the AFL teams were not directly used for player development. Arena football had its own minor league, arenafootball2, for most of the same decade.

The most recent independent minor professional football leagues to play outdoors were the Alliance of American Football, which both began play and folded in 2019, failing to complete its only season, and the  XFL, which shared the name and some ownership with a previous XFL that played one season in 2001, and began play in 2020, one week after the Super Bowl. It declared bankruptcy and shut down after the COVID-19 pandemic forced the league to prematurely end its inaugural season. Afterwards, the rights to the league were bought by Dwayne Johnson and his business partner and former wife Dany Garcia, with Johnson first announcing that the league planned to resume play in 2022 and then delaying that to 2023. The XFL has since announced a formal partnership with the NFL, with the XFL to be used as a test bed for potential NFL rules changes, as well as a developing ground for coaches and game officials.

A new version of the United States Football League started play in 2022, also as a spring league. Partially owned by Fox Sports, it played its first regular season entirely in Birmingham, Alabama, shifting to Canton, Ohio for its playoffs due to scheduling conflicts with Birmingham's hosting of the 2022 World Games. At least some of its teams are expected to move to their nominal home markets for 2023 and beyond.

The Spring League, founded in 2017, is nominally professional but does not pay its players and in fact charges many of its players to participate, a business model that allows it to play without spectators or television revenue.

Indoor American football leagues outside the auspices of the Arena Football League have historically played at a level somewhere on the margins between minor-professional and semi-professional. Some surviving indoor leagues include the American Arena League, Champions Indoor Football, Indoor Football League, and National Arena League. Indoor leagues are notorious for their instability, with teams often folding midway through their seasons, teams jumping between leagues, and leagues often failing to launch or folding abruptly. Fan Controlled Football follows a gaming-inspired, made-for-television approach to the sport, with fans voting on rules, recognizable former NFL players, and power-ups that allow special one-time rule changes.

Volleyball
 Association of Volleyball Professionals (AVP) 
  Volleyball League of America (VLA)
 National Volleyball Association (NVA)
  Athletes Unlimited Volleyball (AUV)

Cricket 
Minor League Cricket is a developmental Twenty20 cricket league for Major League Cricket that had its inaugural season begin in 2021.

See also
 List of professional sports teams in the United States and Canada
 Sports in the United States
 PGA Tour
 NASCAR Cup Series
 Professional sports
 Semi-professional sports
 Amateur sports

Footnotes

References

 
Sports leagues in the United States